The 2014 New Zealand general election, which was held on 20 September 2014, saw the election of 121 candidates — 71 from electorates, 1 overhang, and the remaining 49 from ranked party lists. This page lists candidates by party, including their ranking by party list where applicable.

Within each section, parties are ordered according to their last election result. Where a ranked party list has not been published, or does not cover all announced candidates, candidates are displayed in alphabetical order.

Incumbent parliamentary parties

National Party 
The New Zealand National Party released its party list on 27 July 2014. It has also named candidates for every electorate. One current MP, Claudette Hauiti, was initially announced as the party's candidate for Kelston, but subsequently decided to leave politics. The party list was altered to elevate her replacement, Christopher Penk, from his initial 75th ranking.

Labour Party
The New Zealand Labour Party released its ranked party list and named its electorate candidates prior to the close of nominations.

Green Party 
In March 2014, the Green Party released an "initial draft" of their party list, intended for internal party consultation and voting, which ranked forty-one candidates out of a larger candidate pool. A party list of thirty-nine people was revealed on 25 May. The twelfth-ranked candidate, incumbent MP Holly Walker, subsequently withdrew from the list for family reasons, causing other candidates to move up one place. The party's final list ranks fifty-nine people, with those not previously included being ranked alphabetically.

New Zealand First
New Zealand First announced a party list of twenty-five people on 26 August. The party's final list ranks thirty-one people. A number of electorate selections were also announced, including one (Mere Takoko) who did have a list ranking. Sitting MP Andrew Williams was initially announced as an electorate candidate, but is no longer standing.

Māori Party 
The Māori Party announced a list of twenty-four people on 25 August. In addition, there is one announced electorate candidate (Susan Cullen) who is not on the list.

Internet MANA
The Mana Movement and the Internet Party announced prior to the election that they would contest the election with a joint party list. The top six places on the combined list were specifically assigned to one of the two parties (Mana takes the first, third and fourth; the Internet Party takes the second, fifth, and sixth), while the remaining places will alternate between the two as far as thirty. The Internet Party announced a list of fifteen candidates (to be integrated into the joint list) on 19 June. The Mana Party announced its own list selections on 18 August, and has also named one electorate candidate (Georgina Beyer) who will not have a list ranking.

ACT 
ACT New Zealand announced a twenty-person list on 13 July, and released a modified version (with Max Whitehead omitted and Tim Kronfeld added to the end) in mid-August. The party's final list ranks forty-one people, with those not previously included being ranked in alphabetical order.

United Future 
United Future announced its top ten list candidates (after the party leader) on 3 August 2014. Its final list is slightly modified, with the omission of Ram Parkash (originally ranked ninth) and the addition of Sam Park (eleventh). The party has also announced a number of electorate candidates.

Other registered parties

Conservative Party 
The Conservative Party released a full list of candidates for both the Party and electorate voted. It announced its top five list rankings on 22 August, and then announced a list of twenty people on 26 August.

Legalise Cannabis Party 
The Aotearoa Legalise Cannabis Party announced its first ten list rankings on 10 August, and later announced a slightly modified list of thirteen people on 20 August. Three candidates who had previously been announced (Paula Lambert in Christchurch Central, David Kent in Rongotai, and Richard Neutgens in Auckland Central) were not on the party's final candidates list.

Democrats for Social Credit 
The New Zealand Democratic Party for Social Credit released a party and electorate candidates list. Its final list ranks thirty-five people.

Focus New Zealand 
Focus New Zealand's party list consisted of eight people. It has announced electorate candidates.

1Law4All Party
A post to the 1Law4All Party's Facebook page indicated that the party will not be standing any candidates in the 2014 election. According to the message, the resignation of four out of five board members ("a deliberate act of sabotage") prevents the party from approving a candidate list before the official deadline, no candidates for the party ended up being submitted prior to the closure of nominations.

Independent Coalition 
The NZ Independent Coalition announced a party list of ten people on 19 August 2014.

Ban 1080 
The Ban 1080 Party released a list of nine people on 19 August 2014. Its final list reversed the two final candidates.

Civilian Party 
The Civilian Party's list ranked eight people.

References 

2014 New Zealand general election
Lists of New Zealand political candidates